Quierschied is a municipality in the district of Saarbrücken, in Saarland, Germany. It is situated approximately 11 km northeast of the city of Saarbrücken.

Notable people
Bruno Simma (born 29 March 1941), a German jurist who served as a judge on the International Court of Justice from 2003 until 2012
Armin Hary (born 22 March 1937), a German athlete who won a gold medal in the men's 100 meter dash at the 1960 Summer Olympics.

References

External links
 Offizielle Webseite der Gemeinde Quierschied

Saarbrücken (district)